Jacqueline Roumeguère-Eberhardt (27 November 1927 – 29 March 2006) was a French anthropologist (born South African), research director at the French National Centre for Scientific Research (CNRS) and Africa specialist. She conducted pioneering research in Southern Africa (among the Venda, Tsonga, Shona, Lozi, Bushmen), Central (among the Gbaya) and Kenya (among the Maasai, Samburu, El Molo, Rendille and unidentified hominids), which led her to develop the project "Totemic Geography of Africa "(TGA). During her career, she has collected valuable fieldwork material (interviews, notes, audio and audiovisual recordings, photographs, objects) which now constitute a substantial archive. She is the author of numerous scientific publications (articles, books and movies) in French and English.

Biography (short)

Jacqueline Roumeguère, born Eberhardt

Birth : 1927, at Elim (Transvaal) in the Limpopo Province, R.S.A

Nationality: French

Family status : three children : Isabelle, Caroline, Georges

Scientific aspects

Studies

Pretoria Girls' High School

March 1948 : BA Social Studies (Rand), Max Pollack Prize

December 1949 : M.A With Distinction (Rand)

1950/1954 : Post Graduate Studies at La Sorbonne and EPHE (Paris) in Social Anthropology and Phylosophy with professors : Georges Gurvitch, Gaston Bachelard, Maurice Leenhardt, Marcel Griaule, Claude Lévi-Strauss (who published her first book in his Collection « 1'Homme» )

December 1954 – 2002: Researcher at the CNRS (French National Centre for Scientific Research)

Languages

French, English, Maasai, Venda, Tsonga, Afrikaans, Sotho/Pedi/Tswana, Spanish, Portuguese, Kalanga/Karanga(Shona), Gbaya, Gukwe, Kiswahili

Fieldwork

1954 : Venda, Tsonga (participated at the Khomba and Domba schools), South Africa
1958-1962 : Zimbabwe, Botswana, Kalahari
1963 : Gbaya (Central Africa Republic)
1966/1992/1993 : Lozi, Zambia
1966-2002: Maasai and Samburu, Kenya
1972-1979/1987-2002 : Rendille, Kenya

Research proposals

Totemic Geography Of Africa,
Comparative Social Structures,
Unity And Diversity,
Interpenetration of Religion and Social Structure,
Complementary Kingdoms,
Methodology of Field Work,
Cultural Relativity.

Filmography 

The Python Uncoils, The Domba filmed in 1960, 16 mm, color, 1982–84, Film Director : Jacqueline Roumeguère-Eberhardt, Production: Azakili Films and Cnrs

The Oxe Of The Moon Crescent Horns, 16 mm, color, 1985, Film Director : Jacqueline Roumeguère-Eberhardt, Co-Production: Azakili Films / A2 (French Channel)

Self Control, 16 mm, color, 33mn, 1985, Film Director : Jacqueline Roumeguère-Eberhardt and Isabelle Roumeguère, Production: Azakili Films and Cnrs,

Farewell Great Maasai Warriors, 16 mm, color, 19 mn, 1987, Film Director : Jacqueline Roumeguère-Eberhardt, Production : Azakili Films

From Warriors To Traders, 16 mm, color, 52 mn, 1987, Film Director : Jacqueline Roumeguère-Eberhardt and Meitamei Ole Kapusia, Production: Azakili Films and Fr3

Eunoto, A Maasai Ceremony, 16 mm, color, 52 mn, 1987 Film Director : Jacqueline Roumeguère-Eberhardt And Meitamei Ole Kapusia, Production: Azakili Films And Fr3

Zimbabwe Rituals (4 Films): ZCC, Childrens Games, Drums Cure, Rain Dancers, 1960/1988, Film Director : Jacqueline Roumeguère-Eberhardt, Production: Azakili Films

Parallel Lives, 16 mm, Color, 52 mn, 1991, Film Director : Jacqueline Roumeguère-Eberhardt, Production : Azakili Films

Films nominated for Festivals :

La Mostra, Venise, 1985
Margaret Mead Film Festival, American Museum Ofnatural History, 1985
Festival du Film Ethnologique, Musée De L'homme, Paris, 1985
London Film Festival, 1984 Et 1986
Festival du Film Psy, Loriquin, 1985
Festival du Film Sociologique, Bruxelles, 1986, 1993
President of the Henri Langlois Documentary Film Festival 1990

References

Sources 

Roumeguère, Isabelle & Zanger, Pierre, Memorendum, Jacqueline Roumegère-Eberhardt, Revue d'Outres-Mer, 2006 (to be precised)

See also
More details on the French page (detailed biography, bibliography): Jacqueline Roumeguère-Eberhardt

1927 births
2006 deaths
People from Makhado Local Municipality
French anthropologists
French women anthropologists
20th-century anthropologists
20th-century French women
Research directors of the French National Centre for Scientific Research